Oamaru locomotive dump was created in New Zealand so that obsolete locomotives and rolling stock could be used to stabilize loose ground where rivers and the coast were eroding the ground where the railway lines were built. This was done at a time when scrap steel was an uneconomic proposition. It was located on the coastline in the North Otago town of Oamaru to stabilise land used by New Zealand Railways for their freight yards. Here the coastline of the Pacific Ocean pounded heavily against the land causing major erosion.

Oamaru locomotive dumpsite
By 1930, New Zealand Railways was facing issues with erosion of the Oamaru railway yard by breakers from the Pacific Ocean. Despite the construction of a mole to make the Oamaru harbour more suitable for shipping, this provided no protection for the railway land. As NZR had withdrawn a number of obsolete steam locomotives and scrap prices were low, the decision was made to dump some of these locomotives at Oamaru as erosion control.

The dumpsite was well known to railway enthusiasts, who would visit the site at low tide to view the remains of the locomotives. In 2002, enthusiast Tony Bachelor salvaged the remains of Brooks UB 17 and 1898-built Baldwin UB 282 for his Hooterville Charitable Steam Trust. Due to Hooterville's closure in 2005, the locomotives have since languished on the site of the old Waitara railway yards and are visible from Johnstone Street, Waitara.

In 2008 the dumpsite was threatened again by the sea, and OnTrack began work in June of that year to shore the bank back up. As a part of this, most of the remains of the dump site were removed from the foreshore with some handed over to the Oamaru Steam and Rail Restoration Society for safekeeping. Today the dump site is largely non-existent although the remains of at least 1 Canterbury J Class engine is still in place on the foreshore, having never been recovered for an unknown reason.

Locomotives dumped at Oamaru
The following is a list of locomotives known to have been dumped at Oamaru - in addition, many miscellaneous parts were also dumped at the site. 

Not all of the above existed on the foreshore by the time OnTrack removed the remains in 2008 - some locomotives had been destroyed by wave and rust action, or in at least one case believed to have been sucked out to sea (F 156). None of the locomotives that remained on the foreshore were in a state suitable for restoration due to the harsh salt environment.

Other locomotive dump sites
 Westfield, Auckland
 Omoto
 Beaumont
 Branxholme
 Mararoa
 Bealey River
 Waimakariri River
Mōkihinui River

Notes

Further reading 

Locomotives of New Zealand
Oamaru